The battles of Idar were three major battles fought in the principality of Idar between the armies of the two princes of Idar, Bhar Mal who was supported by the Gujarat Sultanate under Muzaffar Shah II and Rai Mal who was supported by the Rajputs under Rana Sanga. The main reason for Rana Sangas involvement in these battles was to reinstate Rai Mal to his rightful throne and to weaken the growing power of the Gujarat Sultanate. In 1517 Rai Mal with the help of Rana Sanga was able to successfully defeat Muzzafar Shah II and retake his kingdom.

Background
When Sanga came to the throne, the Gujarat Sultanate was at the meridian of its power and prosperity under Muzaffar Shah II. It was through Idar that Sanga came into collision with the Sultan of Gujarat. Idar, was a small Rathore Rajput principality situated on the borders of Gujarat. Its ruler, Rao Bhan, died, leaving two sons, Suraj Mal and Bhim. Suraj Mal succeeded to the throne but died after a reign of 18 months, leaving a minor son Rai Mal, who became the Rao of Idar. He was, however, deposed by Bhim, who usurped the throne. Rai Mal fled to Chittor for shelter. Bhim dying a few days after this, his son Bhar Mal, became Rao of Idar. Rai Mal on growing up to manhood claimed his patrimony with the assistance of Maharana Sanga, in A.D. 1514 he regained Idar, expelling Bhar Mal, who appealed for help to Sultan Muzaffar Shah II of Gujarat Sultanate.

First Battle of idar

Second Battle

The Sultan at this time was on the borders of Malwa watching developments in that country. When the envoys of Bhar Mal reached Muzaffar II, he sent Nizam-ul-mulk with an army to reinstate Bhar Mal on the gadi of Idar. The Mirat-i-sikandari says that" in A.D. 1517, Rai Mal fought with the Gujarat armies and was sometimes defeated sometimes victorious." Ferishta says that Rai Mal was defeated and that he retired to the hilly tract of Bijanagar. Nizam-ul-mulk after reinstating Bhar Mal on the gadi of Idar, went in pursuit of Rai Mal. Rai Mal issued from the hills and attacked the Gujarat army. In the battle that took place, Nizam-ul-mulk was severely defeated and his best officers and soldiers were slain. The Sultan thereupon recalled Nizam-ul-mulk to Ahmadabad.

Third battle

In A.D. 1517, Rai Mal Rathore, assisted by the Maharana re-entered the Idar territory. The Sultan of Gujarat sent his general Zahir-ul-mulk, with a large army against him. Zahir-ul-mulk was, however, attacked by Rai Mal and defeated with great slaughter. Zahir-ul-mulk was killed at the head of his cavalry and the Sultan's army fled to Gujarat. The Sultan now sent Nasrat-ul-mulk, but he too failed to achieve any success against Rai Mal.

Aftermath
Idar was won over by Rai mal Rathore with the help of Rana Sanga but Muzaffar Shah once again took Idar in 1520 leading to Rana Sanga's invasion of Gujarat in which Rana Sanga effectively weakened the Sultanates power by plundering its treasuries and by reinstating Rai mal Rathore as the Rao of Idar.

References

History of Rajasthan
Mewar dynasty
Idar
History of Gujarat
Idar